Tchula is a town in Holmes County, Mississippi, United States. The population was 1,650 at the 2020 census, down from 2,332 in 2000.

A 2015 article in The Guardian described it as the poorest community in the United States.

History
The first permanent settlement at Tchula was made in the 1830s. The community takes its name from Tchula Lake.

In the 1960s most residents were farmworkers; the properties they worked on belonged to people living in other communities in the area. Mississippi columnist Sid Salter stated that the Tchula area had "Some of the best farmland in America" and "some of the most successful plantations".

In 1982 the mayor was incarcerated; he was the town's first black mayor. Chris McGreal of The Guardian stated that the criminal charges were "trumped-up".

In the 2000s the community elected Yvonne Brown as mayor. She was a Republican, and the community hoped this would convince George W. Bush, the President of the United States, to provide additional funding. She was the first black Republican woman to be elected as a mayor in the country.

By 2015 many of the jobs in the area had vanished, partly due to increased use of machines in agriculture. Many businesses formerly in the town had disappeared.

Geography
Tchula is in western Holmes County along Tchula Lake, an old river channel in the Mississippi Delta region of the state. U.S. Route 49E passes through the center of town, leading north  to Greenwood and southwest  to Yazoo. Mississippi Highway 12 leads southeast from Tchula  to Lexington, the Holmes County seat.

Demographics

2020 census

As of the 2020 United States Census, there were 1,652 people, 735 households, and 400 families residing in the town.

2000 census
As of the census of 2000, there were 2,332 people, 724 households, and 524 families residing in the town. The population density was 1,683.6 people per square mile (647.8/km). There were 772 housing units at an average density of 557.4 per square mile (214.4/km). The racial makeup of the town was 3.43% White, 95.93% African American, 0.09% Native American, and 0.56% from two or more races. Hispanic or Latino of any race were 0.47% of the population.

There were 724 households, out of which 38.1% had children under the age of 18 living with them, 21.4% were married couples living together, 45.4% had a female householder with no husband present, and 27.5% were non-families. 25.1% of all households were made up of individuals, and 8.8% had someone living alone who was 65 years of age or older. The average household size was 3.22 and the average family size was 3.92.

In the town, the population was spread out, with 37.9% under the age of 18, 13.0% from 18 to 24, 25.1% from 25 to 44, 14.7% from 45 to 64, and 9.4% who were 65 years of age or older. The median age was 24 years. For every 100 females, there were 80.6 males. For every 100 females age 18 and over, there were 71.5 males.

The median income for a household in the town was $11,571, and the median income for a family was $14,773. Males had a median income of $22,250 versus $16,310 for females. The per capita income for the town was $6,373. About 49.4% of families and 54.4% of the population were below the poverty line, including 66.6% of those under age 18 and 55.8% of those age 65 or over.

In 2010, Tchula had the fifth-lowest median household income of all places in the United States with a population over 1,000.

Government and infrastructure
In 2015 McGreal stated that the police forces were under-equipped. The police chief himself had a second job.

Education
The town of Tchula is served by the Holmes County School District.

Current schools in the area include S.V. Marshall Elementary School and Holmes County Central High School.

The Holmes County Learning Center is in Tchula itself.

Previously Marshall's campus housed S.V. Marshall High School.

Mississippi Blues Trail marker

Notable people
 Woodrow Adams, Delta blues guitarist and harmonica player
 Yvonne Brown (1952–2012), politician elected in Tchula as the first black Republican female mayor in Mississippi, serving from 2001 to 2009. She was the Republican nominee for Mississippi's 2nd congressional district in 2006.
 Jimmy Dawkins (1936–2013), blues guitarist and singer, who moved to Chicago at 18 or 19
 Bess Phipps Dawson, painter and gallerist
 Lester Davenport (1932–2009), blues musician
 Chris Epps, former commissioner of the Mississippi Department of Corrections, pleaded guilty to corruption-related charges
 Johnny Mitchell, former National Football League tight end
 Little Smokey Smothers (1939–2010), blues guitarist and singer
 Hartman Turnbow (1905–1988), first black person in Mississippi to register to vote in the 1960s, following disfranchisement in 1890

References

External links
 

Towns in Holmes County, Mississippi
Towns in Mississippi